Equidae (sometimes known as the horse family) is the taxonomic family of horses and related animals, including the extant horses, asses, and zebras, and many other species known only from fossils. All extant species are in the genus Equus, which originated in North America. Equidae belongs to the order Perissodactyla, which includes the extant tapirs and rhinoceros, and several extinct families.

The term equid refers to any member of this family, including any equine.

Evolution

The oldest known fossils assigned to Equidae were found in North America, and date from the early Eocene epoch, 54 million years ago. They were once assigned to the genus Hyracotherium, but the type species of that genus is now regarded as a palaeothere. The other species have been split off into different genera. These early equids were fox-sized animals with three toes on the hind feet, and four on the front feet. They were herbivorous browsers on relatively soft plants, and already adapted for running. The complexity of their brains suggest that they already were alert and intelligent animals. Later species reduced the number of toes, and developed teeth more suited for grinding up grasses and other tough plant food.

The equids, like other perissodactyls, are hindgut fermenters. They have evolved specialized teeth that cut and shear tough plant matter to accommodate their fibrous diet. Their seemingly inefficient digestion strategy is a result of their size at the time of its evolution, as they would have already had to be relatively large mammals to be supported on such a strategy.

The family became relatively diverse during the Miocene epoch, with many new species appearing. By this time, equids were more truly horse like, having developed the typical body shape of the modern animals. Many of these species bore the main weight of their bodies on their central third toe, with the others becoming reduced and barely touching the ground, if at all. The sole surviving genus, Equus, had evolved by the early Pleistocene epoch, and spread rapidly through the world.

Classification

 Order Perissodactyla (In addition to Equidae, Perissodactyla includes four species of tapir in a single genus, as well as five living species (belonging to four genera) of rhinoceros.) † indicates extinct taxa.
 Family Equidae
 Subfamily †Eohippinae
 Genus †Epihippus
 Genus †Haplohippus
 Genus †Eohippus
 Genus †Minippus
 Subfamily †Propalaeotheriinae
 Genus †Orohippus
 Genus †Pliolophus
 Genus †Protorohippus
 Genus †Sifrhippus
 Genus †Xenicohippus
 Genus †Eurohippus
 Genus †Propalaeotherium?
 Subfamily †Anchitheriinae
 Genus †Anchitherium
 Genus †Archaeohippus
 Genus †Desmatippus
 Genus †Hypohippus
 Genus †Kalobatippus
 Genus †Megahippus
 Genus †Mesohippus
 Genus †Miohippus
 Genus †Parahippus
 Genus †Sinohippus
 Subfamily Equinae
 Genus †Merychippus
 Genus †Scaphohippus
 Genus †Acritohippus
 Tribe †Hipparionini
 Genus †Eurygnathohippus
 Genus †Hipparion
 Genus †Hippotherium
 Genus †Nannippus
 Genus †Neohipparion
 Genus †Proboscidipparion
 Genus †Pseudhipparion
 Tribe Equini
 Genus †Haringtonhippus
 Genus †Heteropliohippus
 Genus †Parapliohippus
 Subtribe Protohippina
 Genus †Calippus
 Genus †Protohippus
 Subtribe Equina
 Genus †Astrohippus
 Genus †Dinohippus
 Genus Equus (22 species, 7 extant)
Equus ferus Wild horse 
 Equus ferus caballus Domestic horse
 †Equus ferus ferus Tarpan
 Equus ferus przewalskii Przewalski's horse
 †Equus algericus
 †Equus alaskae
 †Equus lambei Yukon wild horse
 †Equus niobrarensis
 †Equus scotti
 †Equus conversidens Mexican horse
 †Equus semiplicatus
 Subgenus †Amerhippus (this subgenus and its species are possibly synonymous with E. ferus)
 †Equus andium
 †Equus neogeus
 †Equus insulatus
 Subgenus Asinus
 Equus africanus African wild ass
 Equus africanus africanus Nubian wild ass
 Equus africanus asinus Domestic donkey
 †Equus africanus atlanticus Atlas wild ass
 Equus africanus somalicus Somali wild ass
 Equus hemionus Onager or Asiatic wild ass
 Equus hemionus hemionus Mongolian wild ass
 †Equus hemionus hemippus Syrian wild ass
 Equus hemionus khur Indian wild ass
 Equus hemionus kulan Turkmenian kulan
 Equus hemionus onager Persian onager
 Equus kiang Kiang
 Equus kiang chu Northern kiang
 Equus kiang kiang Western kiang
 Equus kiang holdereri Eastern kiang
 Equus kiang polyodon Southern kiang
 †Equus hydruntinus European ass
 †Equus altidens
 †Equus tabeti
 †Equus melkiensis
 †Equus graziosii
 Subgenus Hippotigris
 Equus grevyi Grévy's zebra
 †Equus koobiforensis
 †Equus oldowayensis
 Equus quagga Plains zebra
 Equus quagga boehmi Grant's zebra
 Equus quagga borensis Maneless zebra
 Equus quagga burchellii Burchell's zebra
 Equus quagga chapmani Chapman's zebra
 Equus quagga crawshayi Crawshay's zebra
 †Equus quagga quagga Quagga
 Equus quagga selousi Selous' zebra
 Equus zebra Mountain zebra
 Equus zebra hartmannae Hartmann's mountain zebra
 Equus zebra zebra Cape mountain zebra
 †Equus capensis
 †Equus mauritanicus
 Subgenus †Parastylidequus
 †Equus parastylidens Mooser's horse
 †Subgenus Sussemionus
 †Equus ovodovi
 incertae sedis
 †Equus simplicidens Hagerman horse
 †Equus cumminsii
 †Equus livenzovensis
 †Equus sanmeniensis
 †Equus teilhardi
 †Equus numidicus
 †Equus plicidens
 †Equus cedralensis
 †Equus stenonis group
 †Equus stenonis Stenon zebra
 †Equus stenonis guthi
 †Equus stenonis senezensis
 †Equus stenonis pamirensis (Hippotigris pamirensis)
 †Equus stenonis petraloniensis
 †Equus stenonis vireti
 †Equus sivalensis
 †Equus stehlini
 †Equus sussenbornensis
 †Equus verae
 †Equus namadicus
 †subgenus Allozebra
 †Equus (A.) occidentalis western horse
 †Equus (A.) excelsus
 †subgenus Hesperohippus
 †Equus (H.) pacificus
 †Equus (H.) mexicanus
 †Equus complicatus
 †Equus fraternus
 †Equus major
 †Equus giganteus
 †Equus pectinatus
 †Equus crenidens
 Genus †Hippidion
 Genus †Onohippidium
 Genus †Pliohippus

Notes

References

 
Extant Ypresian first appearances
Mammal families
Taxa named by John Edward Gray